Metelectrona is a genus of lanternfishes.

Species
There are currently three recognized species in this genus:
 Metelectrona ahlstromi Wisner, 1963
 Metelectrona herwigi Hulley, 1981 (Herwig's lanternfish)
 Metelectrona ventralis (Becker, 1963) (Flaccid lanternfish)

References

Myctophidae
Marine fish genera
Taxa named by Robert Lester Wisner